The Foundation for Science and Technology (FCT) is an organization within the Ministry of Science, Technology and Higher Education in Portugal which evaluates and funds scientific research activities, in particular in the areas of natural sciences, exact sciences, social sciences and humanities. FCT was founded in 1997, succeeding the Junta Nacional de Investigação Científica e Tecnológica.

Vision
 To establish Portugal as a global reference in science, technology and innovation
 Ensure that knowledge generated by scientific research is used fully, for economic growth and the well-being of all citizens

Research units funded by FCT
Most scientific research in Portugal takes place in R&D institutions financed and evaluated by FCT. As of 2019 there are 26 Associate Laboratories and 307 R&D Units, where 22,000 researchers work. These institutions are regularly evaluated by FCT.

Publications

The foundation, together with the University of Lisbon's Centre of Philosophy, publishes a biannual peer-reviewed open-access academic journal, Philosophica, International Journal for the History of Philosophy, which covers all areas of the history of philosophy. Beginning 2022 it is published on their behalf by the Philosophy Documentation Center.

References

External links

Government agencies of Portugal
Science and technology in Portugal
Research funding agencies
Multilingual journals
Philosophy journals
Biannual journals
Publications established in 1993
Philosophy Documentation Center academic journals